The Atlantic Coast League was a high school athletic conference in District C of the Massachusetts Interscholastic Athletic Association.

Schools 
At one point, the ACL had 10 member schools. During the mid-1990s, Hingham, Scituate, and Randolph all left the ACL for the newly formed Patriot League. In 1999, Marshfield left the ACL for the Old Colony League, but re-joined the ACL in 2006. In 2008, Quincy, North Quincy, and Whitman-Hanson all departed the ACL for the Patriot League. In 2015, Plymouth North and Plymouth South, longtime members of the ACL, also departed for the Patriot League.

The following five high schools were members of the Atlantic Coast League in the final year.
 

Former Members
 Hingham
 Plymouth North
 Plymouth South
 Randolph
 Rockland
 Scituate
 Quincy
 North Quincy
 Whitman-Hanson

Football League Champions

2017 - Dennis-Yarmouth (State Champions)
2016 - Falmouth (State Champions)
2015 - Marshfield
2014 - Marshfield (State Champions)
2013 - Plymouth South (State Finalist)
2012 - Plymouth South
2011 - Dennis-Yarmouth (State Champions)
2010 - Dennis-Yarmouth
2009 - Marshfield (State Champions)
2008 - Marshfield (State Finalist)
2007 - Marshfield (State Finalist)
2006 - Marshfield (State Finalist)
2005 - Plymouth North
2004 - Plymouth North
2003 - Plymouth North
2002 - Plymouth North 
2001 - Whitman-Hanson (State Champions)
2000 - Whitman-Hanson (State Finalist)
1999 - Marshfield (State Finalist)
1998 - Marshfield (State Champions)
1997 - Marshfield
1996 - Marshfield (State Champions)
1995 - Marshfield (State Champions)
1994 - Whitman-Hanson (State Champions)
1993 - Whitman-Hanson (State Finalist)
1992 - North Quincy (State Champions)
1991 - Whitman-Hanson (State Finalist)
1990 - Whitman-Hanson

References 

Defunct Massachusetts Interscholastic Athletic Association leagues